The 1971 Mr. Olympia contest was an IFBB professional bodybuilding competition held September 24–25, 1971 at the Maison de la Mutualité in Paris, France.  It was the 7th Mr. Olympia competition held.

The competition was a disappointment to many because three of its four competitors were disqualified before the event, leaving Arnold Schwarzenegger to win the contest unopposed. It was the first time the IFBB barred contestants from any of its events. The IFBB's effort to get bodybuilding represented in the 1976 Olympics required the organization enforce its constitution to give it parity with other official international athletic organizations.
Sergio Oliva and Roy Callender were disqualified for entering unsanctioned meets, and Franco Columbu was disqualified for entering the AAU Mr. World contest the previous year. "If bodybuilding is to become an Olympic Games event it must have an amateur division and it must have rules and regulations specifying who is eligible or not to compete in amateur and professional categories," insisted IFBB President Ben Weider in the keynote speech opening the contest.

Results

Notable events

 Arnold Schwarzenegger won his second consecutive Mr. Olympia title
 Franco Columbu and Sergio Oliva were permitted to pose for the crowd for exhibition in spite of their disqualifications

References

External links 
 Mr. Olympia

 1971
1971 in French sport
1971 in bodybuilding
Bodybuilding competitions in France
International sports competitions hosted by Paris
1971 in Paris
October 1971 sports events in Europe